List of works by or about Patricia Highsmith, American novelist.

Novels
 Strangers on a Train (1950)
 The Price of Salt (1952) (as Claire Morgan) (republished as Carol in 1990 under Highsmith's name)
 The Blunderer (1954)
 Deep Water (1957)
 A Game for the Living (1958)
 This Sweet Sickness (1960)
 The Cry of the Owl (1962)
 The Two Faces of January (1964)
 The Glass Cell (1964)
 A Suspension of Mercy (1965) (published as The Story-Teller in the U.S.)
 Those Who Walk Away (1967)
 The Tremor of Forgery (1969)
 A Dog's Ransom (1972)
 Edith's Diary (1977)
 People Who Knock on the Door (1983)
 Found in the Street (1986)
 Small g: a Summer Idyll (1995)
The "Ripliad"
 The Talented Mr. Ripley (1955)
 Ripley Under Ground (1970)
 Ripley's Game (1974)
 The Boy Who Followed Ripley (1980)
 Ripley Under Water (1991)

Short story collections
 Eleven (1970) (Foreword by Graham Greene). . (published as The Snail-Watcher and Other Stories in the U.S.) 
 Little Tales of Misogyny (1975). (published first as Kleine Geschichten für Weiberfeinde in Switzerland)
 The Animal Lover's Book of Beastly Murder (1975). .
 Slowly, Slowly in the Wind (1979). .
 The Black House (1981).
 Mermaids on the Golf Course (1985).
 Tales of Natural and Unnatural Catastrophes (1987). .
 Chillers (1990). . (publication of Highsmith stories broadcast on U.S. television series Chillers)
 Nothing That Meets the Eye: The Uncollected Stories (2002). . (published posthumously)
 Under a Dark Angel's Eye: The Selected Stories of Patricia Highsmith (2021) (introduction by Carmen Maria Machado). .

Other books
 Miranda the Panda Is on the Veranda (1958) with Doris Sanders. .  (children's book of verse and illustrations)
 Plotting and Writing Suspense Fiction (1966). .  (enlarged and revised edition, 1981)

Essays and articles
 "The Sense of Form," The Writer, January 1948
 "Suspense in Fiction," The Writer, December 1954
 
 "Scene of the Crime" (1989), Granta, Issue No. 29, Winter

Miscellaneous
 "Introduction" (1977), The World of Raymond Chandler.  Miriam Gross, ed., Weidenfeld and Nicolson, United Kingdom: London. . . 
 "Foreword" (1987), Crime and Mystery: The 100 Best Books. H. R. F. Keating, Xanadu, United Kingdom: London. . . .
 "One for the Islands" (2010), Stories of the Sea. Diana Secker Tesdell, ed., p.191. Everyman's Library, United Kingdom: London. . . .

Collected works
 Mystery Cats III: More Feline Felonies (1995) (Signet Books) (anthology includes Patricia Highsmith)
 'The Selected Stories of Patricia Highsmith (2001) (W. W. Norton & Company)
 Patricia Highsmith: Selected Novels and Short Stories'' (2011) (W. W. Norton & Company)

Diaries and memoirs

Biography, critical studies and reviews
Biography
 
 
 
 

Reviews

References

Bibliographies by writer
Bibliographies of American writers